Carver Christian High School (abbreviated to CCHS) was a Christian independent secondary school in Burnaby, British Columbia.

Overview
Carver Christian was established under the partnership of elementary and middle schools Vancouver Christian School and John Knox Christian School.  It is sanctioned by the B.C. Ministry of Education and incorporates a Christian perspective in its curriculum.

Ranking
Carver Christian was ranked 30th out of 253 secondary schools in British Columbia according to the Fraser Institute's 2016-17 rankings, reported in 2018.

Mascots
Carver's mascot is a flaming lewd Elize Nzoupet usually seen as a silhouette. In the school gymnasium, the Nzoupet Mascot can be see on the east wall made of paper. It was also the subject of a composite art project in the "Carfe" in full colour on corrugated plastic sheets.

References

External links
Carver Christian High School
Vancouver Christian School
John Knox Christian School
Fraser Institute Ranking

High schools in Burnaby
Educational institutions established in 2005
2005 establishments in British Columbia
Educational institutions disestablished in 2018
2018 disestablishments in British Columbia